The following outline is provided as an overview of and topical guide to astronomy:

Astronomy – studies the universe beyond Earth, including its formation and development, and the evolution, physics, chemistry, meteorology, and motion of celestial objects (such as galaxies, planets, etc.) and phenomena that originate outside the atmosphere of Earth (such as the cosmic background radiation). Astronomy also intersect with biology, as astrobiology, studying potential life throughout the universe.

Nature of astronomy
Astronomy can be described as all the following:

 An academic discipline: one with academic departments, curricula and degrees; national and international societies; and specialized journals.
 A scientific field (a branch of science) – widely recognized category of specialized expertise within science, and typically embodies it
 A natural science – one that seeks to elucidate the rules that govern the natural world using empirical and scientific methods.
 A branch or field of space science
 A hobby or part-time pursuit for the satisfaction of personal curiosity or appreciation of beauty, the latter especially including astrophotography.

Branches of astronomy
 Astrobiology – studies the advent and evolution of biological systems in the universe.
 Astrophysics – branch of astronomy that deals with the physics of the universe, including the physical properties of celestial objects, as well as their interactions and behavior. Among the objects studied are galaxies, stars, planets, exoplanets, the interstellar medium and the cosmic microwave background; and the properties examined include luminosity, density, temperature, and chemical composition. The subdisciplines of theoretical astrophysics are:
 Compact objects – this subdiscipline studies very dense matter in white dwarfs and neutron stars and their effects on environments including accretion.
 Physical cosmology – origin and evolution of the universe as a whole. The study of cosmology is theoretical astrophysics at its largest scale.
 Quantum cosmology - the study of cosmology through the use of quantum field theory to explain phenomena general relativity cannot due to limitations in its framework.
 Computational astrophysics – The study of astrophysics using computational methods and tools to develop computational models.
 Galactic astronomy – deals with the structure and components of our galaxy and of other galaxies.
 High energy astrophysics – studies phenomena occurring at high energies including active galactic nuclei, supernovae, gamma-ray bursts, quasars, and shocks.
 Interstellar astrophysics – study of the interstellar medium, intergalactic medium and dust.
 Extragalactic astronomy – study of objects (mainly galaxies) outside our galaxy, including Galaxy formation and evolution.
 Stellar astronomy – concerned with Star formation, physical properties, main sequence life span, variability, stellar evolution and extinction.
 Plasma astrophysics – studies properties of plasma in outer space.
 Relativistic astrophysics – studies effects of special relativity and general relativity in astrophysical contexts including gravitational waves, gravitational lensing and black holes.
 Solar physics – Sun and its interaction with the remainder of the Solar System and interstellar space.
 Planetary Science – study of planets, moons, and planetary systems.
 Atmospheric science – study of atmospheres and weather.
 Exoplanetology – various planets outside of the Solar System
 Planetary formation – formation of planets and moons in the context of the formation and evolution of the Solar System.
 Planetary rings – dynamics, stability, and composition of planetary rings
 Magnetospheres – magnetic fields of planets and moons
 Planetary surfaces – surface geology of planets and moons
 Planetary interiors – interior composition of planets and moons
 Small Solar System bodies – smallest gravitationally bound bodies, including asteroids, comets, and Kuiper belt objects.
 Astronomy divided by general technique used for astronomical research:
 Astrometry – study of the position of objects in the sky and their changes of position. Defines the system of coordinates used and the kinematics of objects in our galaxy.
 Observational astronomy – practice of observing celestial objects by using telescopes and other astronomical apparatus. It is concerned with recording data. The subdisciplines of observational astronomy are generally made by the specifications of the detectors: 
 Radio astronomy – Above 300 µm
 Submillimetre astronomy – 200 µm to 1 mm
 Infrared astronomy – 0.7–350 µm
 Optical astronomy – 380–750 nm
 Ultraviolet astronomy – 10–320 nm
 X-ray astronomy – 0.01–10 nm
 Gamma-ray astronomy – Below 0.01 nm
 Cosmic ray astronomy – Cosmic rays, including plasma
 Neutrino astronomy – Neutrinos
 Gravitational wave astronomy – Gravitons
 Photometry – study of how bright celestial objects are when passed through different filters
 Spectroscopy – study of the spectra of astronomical objects
 Other disciplines that may be considered part of astronomy:
 Archaeoastronomy
 Astrochemistry

History of astronomy

History of astronomy
 History of the Center of the Universe
 Geocentric model
 Heliocentrism
 Copernican heliocentrism
 Tychonic system
 Archaeoastronomy
 Archaeoastronomy and Vedic chronology
 Pretelescopic astronomy 
 Babylonian astronomy
 Chinese astronomy
 Egyptian astronomy
 Greek astronomy
 Hebrew astronomy
 Indian astronomy
 Islamic astronomy
 Russian astronomy
 Astronomy in the Middle Ages
 Science in Medieval Western Europe
 Astronomy in medieval Islam
 History of astronomy in the Renaissance
 Scientific developments during the Scientific Revolution
 Patronage in astronomy
 Copernican Revolution
 Copernican heliocentrism
 Nicolaus Copernicus
 On the Revolutions of the Heavenly Spheres
 Tycho Brahe
 Tychonic system
 Galileo Galilei
 Dialogue Concerning the Two Chief World Systems defense of the heliocentric system written by Galileo, which led to his trial and house arrest by the Inquisition.
 Invention of the telescope
 History of visible-light astronomy
 History of astronomy in the Age of Reflection
 Radio astronomy#History of radio astronomy
 History of X-ray astronomy
 History of infrared astronomy
 History of gamma-ray astronomy
 History of supernova observation
 List of supernovae

Basic astronomical phenomena

 Atmosphere
 Celestial pole
 Eclipse
 Ecliptic
 Cosmic rays
 Kepler's laws
 Doppler effect
 Nutation
 Orbit
 Perturbation
 Precession
 Proper motion
 Redshift
 Solar eclipse
 Tides
 Zodiac

Astronomical objects 
Astronomical object

Solar System

 Solar System
 Geology of solar terrestrial planets
 List of Solar System objects
 List of Solar System objects by size
 Galilean satellites
 Halley's comet

Sun

Sun
 Location
 Milky Way
 Solar System
 Stellar classification
 Stellar classification#Class G
 Internal structure
 Standard Solar Model
 Solar core
 Radiation zone
 Convection zone
 Stellar atmosphere
 Photosphere
 Supergranulation
 Granule
 Facula
 Sunspot
 Chromosphere
 Plage
 Spicule
 Moreton wave
 Solar corona
 Solar transition region
 Coronal hole
 Coronal loop
 Coronal mass ejection
 Solar prominence
 Helmet streamer
 Solar variation
 Solar cycle
 List of solar cycles
 Solar maximum
 Solar minimum
 Wolf number
 Solar flare
 Helioseismology
 Heliosphere
 Solar wind
 Heliospheric current sheet
 Heliosphere#Termination shock
 Heliosphere#Heliosheath
 Heliopause
 Bow shock
 Related phenomena
 Solar dynamo
 Solar eclipse
 Sunlight
 Solar energy
 Equipment used to study the Sun
 Solar telescope

Planets 

 Planet
 Features
 Natural satellites (moons)
 Planetary rings
 Planets of the Solar System
 Mercury
 Venus
 Earth
 Moon
 Mars
 Moons of Mars
 Jupiter
 Moons of Jupiter
 Rings of Jupiter
 Saturn
 Moons of Saturn
 Rings of Saturn
 Uranus
 Moons of Uranus
 Rings of Uranus
 Neptune
 Moons of Neptune
 Rings of Neptune
 Dwarf planets of the Solar System
 Ceres
 Pluto
 Moons of Pluto
 Haumea
 Moons of Haumea
 Makemake
 Eris
 Dysnomia

Small Solar System bodies 

Small Solar System body
 Asteroids
 Minor planets
 :Category:Asteroid groups and families
 Vulcanoid asteroids
 Near-Earth asteroids
 Asteroid belt
 Trojan asteroid
 Centaur
 Neptune Trojans
 Minor planet moons
 Meteoroids
 2 Pallas
 3 Juno
 4 Vesta
 10 Hygiea
 List of asteroids
 Meanings of asteroid names
 Trans-Neptunian objects
Kuiper belt
 Plutinos
 90482 Orcus
 28978 Ixion
 Cubewanos
 
 20000 Varuna
 
 
 50000 Quaoar
 38628 Huya
 
Scattered disc
 
 
 90377 Sedna
 Comets
 List of periodic comets
 List of non-periodic comets
 Damocloids
 Hills cloud
 Oort cloud

Exoplanets 
 Exoplanet (also known as extrasolar planets) – planet outside the Solar System. A total of 4,341 such planets have been identified as of 28 Jan 2021.
 Super-Earth – exoplanet with a mass higher than Earth's, but substantially below those of the Solar System's ice giants.
 Mini-Neptune – also known as a gas dwarf or transitional planet. A planet up to 10 Earth masses, but less massive than Uranus and Neptune. 
 Super-Jupiter – an exoplanet more massive than Jupiter.
 Sub-Earth – an exoplanet "substantially less massive" than Earth and Venus.
 Circumbinary planet – an exoplanet that orbits two stars.
 Hot Jupiter – an exoplanet whose characteristics are similar to Jupiter, but that have high surface temperatures because they orbit very close to their parent stars, whereas Jupiter orbits its parent star (the Sun) at 5.2 AU (780×106 km), causing low surface temperatures.
 Hot Neptune – an exoplanet in an orbit close to its star (normally less than one astronomical unit away), with a mass similar to that of Uranus or Neptune.
 Pulsar planet – a planet that orbits a pulsar or a rapidly rotating neutron star.
 Rogue planet (also known as an interstellar planet) – a planetary-mass object that orbits the galaxy directly.

Stars and stellar objects

Stars 

 Stellar evolution
 Star formation
 Pre–main sequence
 Main sequence
 Horizontal branch
 Asymptotic giant branch
 Dredge-up
 Instability strip
 Red clump
 PG 1159 star
 Mira variable
 Planetary nebula
 Protoplanetary nebula
 Luminous red nova
 Luminous blue variable
 Wolf–Rayet star
 Supernova impostor
 Supernova
 Hypernova
 Hertzsprung–Russell diagram
 Color–color diagram
 Protostars
 Molecular cloud
 H II region
 Bok globule
 Young stellar object
 Herbig–Haro object
 Hayashi track
 Hayashi limit
 Henyey track
 Orion variable
 T Tauri star
 FU Orionis star
 Herbig Ae/Be
 Luminosity class
 Subdwarf star
 Dwarf star
 Blue dwarf
 Red dwarf
 Subgiant
 Giant star
 Blue giant
 Red giant
 Bright giant
 Supergiant
 Blue supergiant
 Red supergiant
 Yellow supergiant
 Hypergiant
 Yellow hypergiant
 Blue straggler
 Stellar classification
 O-type main-sequence star
 B-type main-sequence star
 A-type main-sequence star
 F-type main-sequence star
 G-type main-sequence star
 K-type main-sequence star
 M-type main-sequence star
 Be star
 OB star
 Subdwarf B star
 Late-type star
 Peculiar star
 Am star
 Ap and Bp stars
 Rapidly oscillating Ap star
 Barium star
 Carbon star
 CH star
 Extreme helium star
 Lambda Boötis star
 Lead star
 Mercury-manganese star
 S-type star
 Shell star
 Technetium star
 Remnants
 White dwarf
 Black dwarf
 Helium planet
 Neutron star
Pulsar
 Magnetar
 Stellar black hole
 Compact star
 Quark star
 Exotic star
 Stellar core: EF Eridani
 Failed and theoretical stars
 Substellar object
 Brown dwarf
 Sub-brown dwarf
 Planetar
 Boson star
 Dark star
 Quasistar
 Thorne–Żytkow object
 Iron star
 Stellar nucleosynthesis
 Alpha process
 Triple-alpha process
 Proton–proton chain reaction
 Helium flash
 CNO cycle
 Lithium burning
 Carbon-burning process
 Neon-burning process
 Oxygen-burning process
 Silicon-burning process
 S-process
 R-process
 Fusor
 Nova
 Nova remnant
 Stellar structure
 Solar core
 Convection zone
 Microturbulence
 Solar-like oscillations
 Radiation zone
 Photosphere
 Starspot
 Chromosphere
 Stellar corona
 Stellar wind
 Stellar-wind bubble
 Asteroseismology
 Eddington luminosity
 Kelvin–Helmholtz mechanism
 Properties
 Star designation
 Stellar dynamics
 Effective temperature
 Stellar kinematics
 Stellar magnetic field
 Magnitude
 Absolute magnitude
 Solar mass
 Metallicity
 Stellar rotation
 UBV photometric system
 Variable star
 Star systems
 Binary star
 Contact binary
 Common envelope
 Multiple star
 Accretion disc
 Planetary system
 Earth's Solar System
 Earth-centric observation of stars
 Pole star
 Circumpolar star
 Magnitude
 Apparent magnitude
 Photographic magnitude
 color-color diagram
 Radial velocity
 Proper motion
 Parallax#Stellar parallax
 Photometric-standard star
 Lists of stars
 List of proper names of stars
 List of Arabic star names
 Traditional Chinese star names
 List of most massive stars
 List of least massive stars
 List of largest known stars
 List of brightest stars
 Historical brightest stars
 List of most luminous stars
 List of nearest stars
 List of nearest bright stars
 List of exoplanetary host stars
 List of brown dwarfs
 List of planetary nebulae
 List of novae
 List of supernovae
 List of supernova remnants
 List of supernova candidates
 Timeline of stellar astronomy

Variable stars 

Variable star
 Pulsating
 Cepheids and cepheid-like
 Cepheid variable
 Type II Cepheids
 RR Lyrae variable
 Delta Scuti variable
 SX Phoenicis variable
 Blue-white with early spectra
 Beta Cephei variable
 PV Telescopii variable
 Long Period and Semiregular
 Mira variable
 Semiregular variable
 Slow irregular variable
 Other
 RV Tauri variable
 Alpha Cygni variable
 Pulsating white dwarf
 Eruptive
 Pre-main sequence star
 Herbig Ae/Be
 Orion variable
 FU Orionis star
 Main Sequence
 Wolf-Rayet star
 Flare star
 Giants and supergiants
 Luminous blue variable
 Gamma Cassiopeiae variable
 R Coronae Borealis variable
 Eruptive binary
 RS Canum Venaticorum variable
 Cataclysmic or explosive
 Cataclysmic variable star
 Dwarf nova
 Nova
 Supernova
 Z Andromedae
 Rotating
 Non-spherical
  Ellipsoidal
 Stellar spots
 FK Comae Berenices
 BY Draconis variable
 Magnetic fields
 Alpha² Canum Venaticorum variable
 SX Arietis
 Pulsar
 Eclipsing binary
 Algol variable
 Beta Lyrae variable
 W Ursae Majoris variable

Supernovae 

Supernova
 Classes
 Type Ia supernova
 Type Ib and Ic supernovae
 Type II (IIP and IIL)
 Related
 Near-Earth supernova
 Supernova impostor
 Hypernova
 Quark-nova
 Pulsar kicks
 Structure
 Pair-instability supernova
 Supernova nucleosynthesis
 P-process
 R-process
 Gamma-ray burst
 Carbon detonation
 Progenitors
 Luminous blue variable
 Wolf–Rayet star
 Supergiant
 Blue supergiant
 Red supergiant
 Yellow supergiant
 Hypergiant
 Yellow hypergiant
 White dwarf
 Remnants
 Supernova remnant
 Neutron star
 Pulsar
 Magnetar
 Stellar black hole
 Compact star
 Supergiant
 Quark star
 Exotic star
 Discovery
 Guest star
 History of supernova observation
 Timeline of white dwarfs, neutron stars, and supernovae
 Notable
 List of supernovae
 List of supernova remnants
 List of supernova candidates
 List of most massive stars
 Supernovae in fiction
 SN 1054
 Supergiant
 Crab Nebula
 Tycho's
 Kepler's
 SN 1987A
 SN 185
 SN 1006
 SN 2003fg
 Vela Supernova Remnant
 Remnant G1.9+0.3
 SN 2007bi
 Research
 Supernova Cosmology Project
 High-z Supernova Search Team
 Texas Supernova Search
 Nearby Supernova Factory
 Supernova Legacy Survey
 Supernova Early Warning System
 Monte Agliale Supernovae and Asteroid Survey
 Supernova/Acceleration Probe
 Sloan Digital Sky Survey#Sloan Supernova Survey

Black holes 

Black hole
 Types
Schwarzschild metric
 Rotating black hole
 Charged black hole
 Virtual black hole
 Size
Micro black hole
 Extremal black hole (Black hole electron)
 Stellar black hole
 Intermediate-mass black hole
 Supermassive black hole
 Quasar
 Active galactic nucleus
 Blazar
 Formation
Stellar evolution
 Gravitational collapse
 Neutron star (Template:neutron star)
 Compact star
 Quark star
 Exotic star
 Tolman–Oppenheimer–Volkoff limit
 White dwarf (Template:white dwarf)
 Supernova (Template:supernovae)
 Hypernova
 Gamma-ray burst
 Properties
Black hole thermodynamics
 Schwarzschild radius
 M–sigma relation
 Event horizon
 Quasi-periodic oscillation
 Photon sphere
 Ergosphere
 Hawking radiation
 Penrose process
 Bondi accretion
 Spaghettification
 Gravitational lens
 Models
Gravitational singularity (Penrose–Hawking singularity theorems)
 Primordial black hole
 Gravastar
 Dark star
 Dark energy star
 Black star
 Magnetospheric eternally collapsing object
 Fuzzball
 White hole
 Naked singularity
 Ring singularity
 Immirzi parameter
 Membrane paradigm
 Kugelblitz
 Wormhole
 Quasistar
 Issues
No-hair theorem
 Black hole information paradox
 Cosmic censorship hypothesis
 Nonsingular black hole models
 Holographic principle
 Black hole complementarity
 Metrics
Schwarzschild metric
 Kerr metric
 Reissner–Nordström
 Kerr–Newman
 Related
List of black holes
 Timeline of black hole physics
 Rossi X-ray Timing Explorer
 Hypercompact stellar system

Constellations
 Constellation

The 88 modern constellations

 Andromeda
 Antlia
 Apus
 Aquarius
 Aquila
 Ara
 Aries
 Auriga
 Boötes
 Caelum
 Camelopardalis
 Cancer
 Canes Venatici
 Canis Major
 Canis Minor
 Capricornus
 Carina
 Cassiopeia
 Centaurus
 Cepheus
 Cetus
 Chamaeleon
 Circinus
 Columba
 Coma Berenices
 Corona Australis
 Corona Borealis
 Corvus
 Crater
 Crux
 Cygnus
 Delphinus
 Dorado
 Draco
 Equuleus
 Eridanus
 Fornax
 Gemini
 Grus
 Hercules
 Horologium
 Hydra
 Hydrus
 Indus
 Lacerta
 Leo
 Leo Minor
 Lepus
 Libra
 Lupus
 Lynx
 Lyra
 Mensa
 Microscopium
 Monoceros
 Musca
 Norma
 Octans
 Ophiuchus
 Orion
 Pavo
 Pegasus
 Perseus
 Phoenix
 Pictor
 Pisces
 Piscis Austrinus
 Puppis
 Pyxis
 Reticulum
 Sagitta
 Sagittarius
 Scorpius
 Sculptor
 Scutum
 Serpens
 Sextans
 Taurus
 Telescopium
 Triangulum
 Triangulum Australe
 Tucana
 Ursa Major
 Ursa Minor
 Vela
 Virgo
 Volans
 Vulpecula

Constellation history

The 48 constellations listed by Ptolemy after 150 AD 

 Andromeda
 Aquarius
 Aquila
 Ara
 Argo Navis
 Aries
 Auriga
 Boötes
 Cancer
 Canis Major
 Canis Minor
 Capricornus
 Cassiopeia
 Centaurus
 Cepheus
 Cetus
 Corona Australis
 Corona Borealis
 Corvus
 Crater
 Cygnus
 Delphinus
 Draco
 Equuleus
 Eridanus
 Gemini
 Hercules
 Hydra
 Leo
 Lepus
 Libra
 Lupus
 Lyra
 Ophiuchus
 Orion
 Pegasus
 Perseus
 Pisces
 Piscis Austrinus
 Sagitta
 Sagittarius
 Scorpius
 Serpens
 Taurus
 Triangulum
 Ursa Major
 Ursa Minor
 Virgo

The 41 additional constellations added in the 16th and 17th centuries 

 Vespucci or Corsalius early 16c: Crux
 Triangulum Australe ▶ Vopel 1536: Coma Berenices ▶ Keyser & de Houtman 1596: Apus
 Chamaeleon
 Dorado
 Grus
 Hydrus
 Indus
 Musca
 Pavo
 Phoenix
 Tucana
 Volans ▶ <span style="background-color: #FFFFc0; ">Plancius 1613:</span> Camelopardalis
 Columba
 Monoceros ▶ Habrecht 1621: Reticulum ▶ Hevelius 1683: Canes Venatici
 Lacerta
 Leo Minor
 Lynx
 Scutum
 Sextans
 Vulpecula ▶ de Lacaille 1763: Antlia
 Caelum
 Carina
 Circinus
 Fornax
 Horologium
 Mensa
 Microscopium
 Norma
 Octans
 Pictor
 Puppis
 Pyxis
 Sculptor
 Telescopium
 Vela

 Obsolete constellations including Ptolemy's Argo Navis 

Obsolete constellations including Ptolemy's Argo NavisAnser
 Antinous
 Argo Navis
 Asterion
 Cancer Minor
 Cerberus
 Chara
 Custos Messium
 Felis
 Frederici Honores/Gloria Frederici
 Gallus
 Globus Aerostaticus
 Jordanus
 Lochium Funis
 Machina Electrica
 Malus
 Mons Maenalus
 Musca Borealis
 Noctua
 Officina Typographica
 Polophylax
 Psalterium Georgianum/Harpa Georgii
 Quadrans Muralis
 Ramus Pomifer
 Robur Carolinum
 Sceptrum Brandenburgicum
 Sceptrum et Manus Iustitiae
 Solarium
 Rangifer/Tarandus
 Taurus Poniatovii
 Telescopium Herschelii
 Testudo
 Tigris
 Triangulum Minus
 Turdus Solitarius
 Vespa
 Vultur cadens
 Vultur volans

Clusters and nebulae

 Interstellar matter
 Nebula
 Crab Nebula
 H I region
 H II region
 Orion nebula
 Planetary nebula
 Pleiades

Galaxies
 Galaxy
 Andromeda Galaxy
 Magellanic Clouds
 Quasar

Cosmology

 Big Bang
 Cosmic microwave background
 Cosmos
 Dark matter
 Cosmic distance ladder
 Hubble constant
 Olbers's paradox
 Universe

Space exploration
 See: Outline of space explorationOrganizations

Public sector space agencies

Space agencies

Africa

North Africa
  Algerian Space Agency
  National Authority for Remote Sensing and Space Sciences
 Egypt Remote Sensing Center
  Royal Centre for Remote Sensing
  National Remote Sensing Center

Sub-Saharan
  National Space Research and Development Agency
  South African National Space Agency

North America
  Agencia Espacial Mexicana
  Canadian Space Agency
  NASA
  United States Department of Defense
 National Reconnaissance Office
 United States Army Space and Missile Defense Command
 United States Space Command
 United States Space Force

South America
  Agencia Bolivariana para Actividades Espaciales
  Brazilian Space Agency
  Brazilian General Command for Aerospace Technology
  Colombian Space Commission
  Comisión Nacional de Actividades Espaciales
  Comisión Nacional de Investigación y Desarrollo Aeroespacial
  Instituto Tecnológico de Aeronáutica
  Instituto Venezolano de Investigaciones Científicas
  National Institute for Space Research

Asia

East Asia
  China Aerospace Science and Technology Corporation (China Academy of Launch Vehicle Technology
 China Academy of Space Technology
 China Chang Feng
 China Aerospace Science and Technology Corporation
 Commission for Science, Technology and Industry for National Defense)
 China National Space Administration
  Japan Aerospace Exploration Agency (Institute of Space and Astronautical Science
 National Aerospace Laboratory of Japan
 National Space Development Agency of Japan)
 National Institute of Information and Communications Technology
 Institute for Unmanned Space Experiment Free Flyer
  National Remote Sensing Center
  Korean Committee of Space Technology
  Korea Aerospace Research Institute
  National Space Organization

Southeast Asia
  National Institute of Aeronautics and Space
  Malaysian Space Agency
  Philippine Atmospheric, Geophysical and Astronomical Services Administration
  Thai Ministry of Science and Technology's Space Agency
  Space Technology Institute
 Vietnam Space Commission

South Asia
  Space Research and Remote Sensing Organization
  Department of Space
 Antrix Corporation
 Indian Institute of Space Science and Technology
 Indian Space Research Organisation
 National Atmospheric Research Laboratory
 New Space India Limited
 North-Eastern Space Applications Centre
 Physical Research Laboratory
 Semi-Conductor Laboratory
   Space and Upper Atmosphere Research Commission

Southwest Asia
  Azerbaijan National Aerospace Agency
  Iran Aviation Industries Organization
 Iranian Space Agency
  Israel Space Agency
 National Committee for Space Research
  TÜBİTAK UZAY

Central Asia
  KazCosmos
 Kazakh Space Research Institute
  Turkmenistan National Space Agency
  UzbekCosmos

Europe
  Austrian Space Agency
  Belarus Space Agency
  Belgian Institute for Space Aeronomy
  Bulgarian Space Agency
  Czech Space Office
  Danish National Space Center
 esa European Cooperation for Space Standardization
 European Space Agency
  EUMETSAT
 European Union Satellite Centre
  CNES
  German Aerospace Center
  Institute for Space Applications and Remote Sensing
  Hungarian Space Office
  Space Ireland
  Italian Space Agency
  Space Science and Technology Institute
  Luxinnovation
  Netherlands Institute for Space Research
  Norwegian Space Centre
  Space Research Centre
  Portuguese Space Company
  Romanian Space Agency
  Russian Federal Space Agency
 Russian Space Research Institute
 Russian Space Forces
  Soviet space program
  Instituto Nacional de Técnica Aeroespacial
  Swedish National Space Board
  Swiss Space Office
  UK Space Agency
  State Space Agency of Ukraine

Oceania
  Commonwealth Scientific and Industrial Research Organisation

World
 Asia-Pacific Space Cooperation Organization
 Consultative Committee for Space Data Systems
  Committee on Space Research
 International Academy of Astronautics
 International Telecommunications Satellite Organization
 Intercosmos
 Intersputnik
  Pan-Arab Space Agency
  United Nations
 United Nations Committee on the Peaceful Uses of Outer Space
 United Nations Office for Outer Space Affairs

 Preceded by the Soviet space program

Books and publications

 Almagest Astronomia Nova Astronomical Journal Astrophysical Journal BD Catalogue De Revolutionibus Henry Draper Catalogue Messier Catalogue New General Catalogue Principia''

Astronomers

 Aryabhata
 Walter Baade
 Friedrich Bessel
 Tycho Brahe
 Annie Jump Cannon
 Alvan Clark
 Nicholas Copernicus
 Galileo Galilei
 George Ellery Hale
 William Herschel
 Edwin Hubble
 Jacobus Kapteyn
 Johannes Kepler
 Gerard Kuiper
 Henrietta Leavitt
 Isaac Newton
 Edward C. Pickering
 Ptolemy
 Henry Norris Russell
 Harlow Shapley

See also

 Asterism
 Constellation
 Galaxy
 Globular cluster
 Gravitation
 Guest star
 Helioseismology
 Infrared dark cloud
 Intergalactic star
 Open cluster
 Planet
 Star cluster
 Stellar association
 Supercluster

References

External links

Astronomy Guide For reviews on astronomy products, how-to's and current events.
Astronomy Net Resources, forums (from 1995), articles on Astronomy.
International Year of Astronomy 2009 IYA2009 Main website
 Cosmic Journey: A History of Scientific Cosmology from the American Institute of Physics
Astronomy Picture of the Day
Southern Hemisphere Astronomy
Sky & Telescope publishers
Astronomy Magazine
Latest astronomy news in 11 languages
Universe Today for astronomy and space-related news
Celestia Motherlode Educational site for Astronomical journeys through space
Search Engine for Astronomy
Hubblesite.org – home of NASA's Hubble Space Telescope
Astronomy – A History – G. Forbes – 1909 (eLibrary Project – eLib Text)
  (historical)
 Prof. Sir Harry Kroto, NL, Astrophysical Chemistry Lecture Series. 8 Freeview Lectures provided by the Vega Science Trust.
 Core books and core journals in Astronomy, from the Smithsonian/NASA Astrophysics Data System

Astronomy
Outline
 
Outlines of sciences
Wikipedia outlines